Franz Kamphaus (born 2 February 1932) is a German Catholic priest, bishop emeritus of the Diocese of Limburg. He was bishop of the diocese from 1982 to 2007. He was the only German bishop to oppose Pope John Paul II in the matter of counseling pregnant women in conflict situations. Before being bishop, he taught pastoral theology and homiletics at the University of Münster; afterwards he became minister of a home for people with physical and mental disabilities in Aulhausen.

Career

Münster 
He studied theology and philosophy at the University of Münster and the Ludwig Maximilian University of Munich and was ordained as a priest on 21 February 1959 by the bishop of Münster, . He worked as Kaplan (assistant minister) in Münster and Ahaus. From 1964 he was responsible for the diocese's Predigtausbildung (education for sermon).

Kamphaus earned a doctoral degree from the University of Münster in 1968 with the dissertation Von der Exegese zur Predigt. Über die Problematik einer schriftgemäßen Verkündigung der Oster-, Wunder- und Kindheitsgeschichten, on the topic of preaching about the biblical stories of Easter, miracles and the youth of Jesus. From 1971 he led the diocese's continuing education of preachers. From 1972 he taught pastoral theology and homiletics at the University of Münster. From 1973 he was also Regens (director) of the diocese's Priesterseminar (seminary for candidates for the priesthood).

Limburg 
On 3 May 1982 pope John Paul II announced Kamphaus as bishop of Limburg. He was ordained on 13 June by cardinal Joseph Höffner.

Kamphaus lived in an apartment in the Priesterseminar, while a family of refugees lived in the bishop's residence. He spoke of a "Bundesrepublik Erde" (Federal Republic Earth) granting peace, freedom and justice for all, and said that Christians need to stand side by side with the victims, the hungry, the injured, those who flee and cry.

In his diocese, women were able to receive "Beratungsscheine" (certificates after counseling) which made unpunished abortions possible. He said that prayer and meditation helped him to take the side of the women in need, against the pope. A papal decision of 8 March 2002 "stripped the bishop of his authority over the counseling centers in the Limburg diocese." Kamphaus said: "I am still convinced that our way of counselling women would save the lives of many more children". He also commented that the Vatican's action would leave a "deep wound" in the German diocese, but said that he had concluded his resignation would not help to heal that wound. Instead, he said, he would continue to act as bishop, "wounded but unbroken" by the unusual disciplinary measure. A private association, "Donum vitae", took over the counseling, as in other dioceses before.

 
From 1999 to 2006 Kamphaus was president of the Commission for International Church Affairs (de) of the German Bishops' Conference which is responsible for international collaboration and the dialogue between religions. He travelled to Africa, Asia and Latin America, requesting more solidarity and social justice.

On his 75th birthday, Kamphaus submitted his resignation to Pope Benedict XVI, who accepted it. A farewell service was held in a vespers service that day. His successor was Franz-Peter Tebartz-van Elst.

Aulhausen 
After his retirement, Kamphaus has served as minister of the St. Vincenzstift (de), a home for people with physical and mental disabilities, in Aulhausen, where he lives. He realized that the humanity of a society can be seen in its way to deal with illness and disabilities in all phases of life. Kamphaus himself suffers from tremor. Facing the challenge to preach for handicapped people, he found: "Es geht darum, unsere großen biblischen Wörter zu elementarisieren, ohne dabei banal zu werden." (We need to simplify our big biblical words without getting trivial.) He stressed the importance of songs for the mostly illiterate people, and he realises: "Das Allerwichtigste ist, einfach da zu sein. Entscheidend ist nicht so sehr, was ich sage oder tue, sondern dass ich hier wohne und lebe." (Most important is to simply be there. It's not important what I say or do, but that I live here.)

Awards 
Kamphaus accepted only two of the many awards offered to him:

 10 January 2004  of Frankfurt
 13 June 2007 Honorary Citizen of Limburg

Selected works 

A compilation of texts by Franz Kamphaus was published in 2013, titled "Mach's wie Gott, werde Mensch" (Do it like God, become human).

 Von der Exegese zur Predigt. Dissertation University of Münster. Matthias-Grünewald-Verlag, Mainz 1968
 Gospels for Preachers and Teachers. Sheed & Ward Ltd 1974, 
 Die Welt zusammenhalten. Reden gegen den Strom. Herder, 2008, 
 Gott ist kein Nostalgiker. Anstöße für die Fasten- und Osterzeit. Herder, 2012, 
 Mach's wie Gott, werde Mensch Herder, 2013,

Literature 

 Josef Hainz, Hans-Winfried Jüngling, Reinholf Sebott, Den Armen eine frohe Botschaft. For the 65th birthday of Franz Kamphaus. Frankfurt 2001
 Wissen, dass der Himmel trägt. Franz Kamphaus. Worte, Wege und Gefährten. Freiburg, Basel, Wien 2007

References

External links 

 
 Franz Kamphaus Catholic Hierarchy
 Bisherige Bischöfe Diocese of Limburg 

20th-century German Roman Catholic bishops
Roman Catholic bishops of Limburg
Academic staff of the University of Münster
1932 births
Living people
People from Limburg an der Lahn
People from Lüdinghausen
21st-century German Roman Catholic bishops
20th-century German Roman Catholic priests